Museum Week is a global event that takes place during one week each year with the participation of museums, associations, and cultural institutions.

Museum Week started in 2014 with a collaboration of twelve French museums wishing to expand their audience, each year the event promotes a different international cause.

In 2015, the second year, Museum Week became a trending global cultural event on Twitter.

History
Institutions open their doors both virtually and physically. On Twitter, they use seven hashtags (including the hashtag #MuseumWeek), using a different hashtag each day for a week (see table below). Launched in 2014 on Twitter, Museum Week brought together almost 700 European institutions on Twitter in the first year.

In 2015, the Cité des Sciences et de l'Industrie organized an event asking one question: "What is the cultural heritage of our time that will be passed on to future generations?" In response, the institution set out to archive all Tweets featuring the word #MuseumWeek in a time capsule. With a size of 60 × 30 × 28.6 cm and a weight of 30 kilos, the capsule is composed of acrylic, glass, carbon fibre, and metal. Sealed on March 29, 2015 at midnight, it will not be opened before 2035 and contains information for future generations about our way of life and our consumption of art in 2015.

The 4th event took place in 2017 on new platforms: Instagram, Snapchat, the Chinese social network Weibo, and the Russian network Vkontakte. The event is organized by the association Culture for Causes Network. Each year, MuseumWeek promotes a different theme. 

The 2017 MuseumWeek mobilized 2,200 institutions, museums, libraries, galleries in 2016 and expanded to 75 countries in 2017. Almost 5,000 institutions participated in 2018, in 120 countries .

In 2019, MuseumWeek, used the hashtag #WomenInCulture to highlight the place of women in culture in the past, present, and future. Among the events was one in Paris with the artist Adelaide Damoah at the Cite nationale de l’histoire de l’immigration and in New York at Michele Mariaud Gallery with Laurence de Valmy.

In 2020, Museum Week partnered with MTArt Agency founded by Marine Tanguy to promote the event.

In 2021 Museum Week is from June 7-13. Unesco is among their partners.

References

External links
 Museum Week official website

2014 establishments in France
Recurring events established in 2014
Museum events
Annual events in France
Twitter